capitulum (plural capitula) may refer to:

the Latin word for chapter
 an index or list of chapters at the head of a gospel manuscript
 a short reading in the Liturgy of the Hours
 derived from which, it is the Latin for the assembly known as a chapter
 a typographic symbol (⸿), to mark chapters or paragraphs, now evolved into the pilcrow

Botany
 Capitulum (flower), a type of flower head composed of numerous tiny florets, characteristic of the family Asteraceae
 Capitulum (moss), the top of a Sphagnum moss plant with compact clusters of young branches; also the apothecium (fruiting body) of lichens of the order Calicium

Zoology
 the capitulum of the humerus in vertebrates
 the gnathosoma of ticks and mites
 in stalked barnacles, the armoured portion within which the appendages and most of the viscera are located 
 Capitulum (genus), a genus of goose barnacles
 a part of the female Lepidoptera genitalia
 a structure similar to an elaiosome, found on the eggs of some species of stick insects